A river icebreaker is an icebreaker specially designed to operate in shallow waters such as rivers and estuaries, and often able to pass through canals and under bridges. As published by the American Society of Civil Engineers almost a century ago, "On some rivers, particularly where melting first takes place on the upper river, as on the Oder and Weichsel in Germany, the formation of ice jams is a frequent cause of floods." River icebreakers can operate in any navigable waterway to prevent such ice jams. 

Various river icebreakers, from smaller vessels to the nuclear-powered shallow draft icebreakers Taymyr-class Vaygach and Taymyr, are also in service in the large rivers of the Russian arctic.

The oldest river icebreaker in the world that is still in service is the Kuna.

See also

References

Bibliography 

Icebreakers
Ship types